Left-arm unorthodox spin, also known as slow left-arm wrist-spin, is a type of spin bowling in the sport of cricket. Left-arm unorthodox spin bowlers use wrist spin to spin the ball, and make it deviate, or 'turn' from left to right after pitching. The direction of turn is the same as that of a traditional right-handed off spin bowler, although the ball will usually turn more sharply due to the spin being imparted predominantly by the wrist.

Some left-arm unorthodox bowlers also bowl the equivalent of a googly, or 'wrong'un', which turns from right to left on the pitch. The ball turns away from the right-handed batsman, as if the bowler were an orthodox left-arm spinner. The delivery was sometimes historically called a chinaman.

Notable left-arm unorthodox spin bowlers
The first cricketer known to bowl the style of delivery was 19th-century South African bowler Charlie Llewellyn. Llewellyn toured North America with Bernard Bosanquet, the originator of the googly delivery, and it is likely that Llewellyn learned the googly-style of delivery from him, bowling it with his left-arm. Chuck Fleetwood-Smith, an ambidextrous Australian bowler, notably used the delivery in the 1930s, including in his 10 Test matches.

Among noted players who have bowled the delivery are Denis Compton, who originally bowled orthodox slow-left arm deliveries but developed left-arm wrist spin, taking most of his 622 first-class wickets using the delivery. Although better known for fast bowling and orthodox slow left-arm, Garfield Sobers could also use it to good effect. In cricket's modern era, Australian Brad Hogg brought the delivery to wider notice and had one of the most well-disguised wrong'uns. Kuldeep Yadav, who debuted for India in March 2017, bowls left-arm wrist spin, and Paul Adams played 45 Test matches and 24 One-day internationals for South Africa between 1995 and 2004 using the delivery. Michael Bevan and Dave Mohammed are also considered to be "among the better known" bowlers to use the style.

In 2021 The Guardian claimed that Kuldeep, Tabraiz Shamsi of South Africa and the Afghan bowler Noor Ahmad were "probably the foremost left-arm wrist-spinners in world cricket", while in 2022 Michael Rippon was reported as "the first specialist left-arm wristspinner" to play for New Zealand. In the women's game, Kary Chan of Hong Kong uses left-arm wrist spin deliveries.

CricInfo suggests that left-arm wrist-spin bowlers are uncommon because it is "difficult to control left-arm wrist spin. And ... the ball coming in to a right-hander is considered less dangerous than the one leaving him". Instances of left-arm unorthodox spinners taking ten wickets in a Test match are, therefore, rare. Examples where this has occurred include Chuck Fleetwood-Smith against England in 1936–37, Michael Bevan against the West Indies in 1996–97, and Paul Adams against Bangladesh in 2002–03.

Historical use of the name Chinaman
Historically the term "chinaman" was sometimes used to describe the googly delivery or other unusual deliveries, whether bowled by right or left-arm bowlers. The left-arm wrist spinner's delivery that is the equivalent of the googly eventually became known as the "chinaman".

The origin of the term is unclear, although it is known to have been in use in Yorkshire during the 1920s and may have been first used in reference to Roy Kilner. It is possible that it is a guarded reference to Charlie Llewellyn, the first left-arm bowler to bowl the equivalent of the googly. It is first known to have been used in print in The Guardian in 1926 in reference to the possibility of Yorkshire bowler George Macaulay bowling a googly, but the term became more widely used after a Test match between England and West Indies at Old Trafford in 1933. Ellis Achong, a player of Chinese origin who bowled slow left-arm orthodox spin, had Walter Robins stumped off a surprise delivery that spun into the right-hander from outside the off stump. As he walked back to the pavilion, Robins reportedly said to the umpire, "fancy being done by a bloody Chinaman!", leading to the more widespread use of the term.

In 2017, Australian journalist Andrew Wu, who is of Chinese descent, raised concerns about the use of the term as "racially offensive", arguing the term itself "has historically been used in a contemptuous manner to describe the Chinese". Wisden formally changed their wording of the term to slow left-arm wrist-spin in the 2018 edition of the Almanack, describing chinaman as "no longer appropriate". CricInfo followed suit in 2021, noting that although some argued that its use in cricket "was not meant to be derogatory", that its continued use was inappropriate. Some writers continue to use the term.

Notes

References

 Cricket and Race by Jack Williams 
 Wisden, 1968, 1987 and 2018 editions

Cricket terminology
Bowling (cricket)